Joseph Limprecht (July 22, 1946 – May 19, 2002) was an American diplomat who was a member of the Senior Foreign Service. He served as the U.S. Ambassador to Albania. Limprecht was nominated on May 12, 1999 and confirmed on July 1, 1999.  He died from a heart attack at the age of 55 while visiting Lure National Park in northern Albania.  He is buried at Arlington National Cemetery.

Born and raised in Omaha, Nebraska, Limprecht graduated from the University of Chicago before earning a Masters in Public Administration from Harvard University and a Ph.D. in history from the University of California, Berkeley.

Career
Limprecht joined the Foreign Service in 1975.  His posts included serving as public safety adviser at the U.S. mission in Berlin from 1985 to 1988 and directing anti-narcotics operations in Islamabad, Pakistan until 1991.  Stateside, he was deputy director of the Office of Israel and Arab-Israeli Affairs and a division chief in State's personnel bureau. His last post before becoming Ambassador was deputy chief of mission at the U.S. Embassy in Tashkent, Uzbekistan.

References

1946 births
2002 deaths
People from Omaha, Nebraska
Burials at Arlington National Cemetery
University of Chicago alumni
Harvard Kennedy School alumni
University of California, Berkeley alumni
United States Foreign Service personnel
Ambassadors of the United States to Albania
20th-century American diplomats
21st-century American diplomats